Burr Oak Township, Kansas may refer to:

 Burr Oak Township, Doniphan County, Kansas
 Burr Oak Township, Jewell County, Kansas

See also 
 List of Kansas townships
 Burr Oak Township (disambiguation)

Kansas township disambiguation pages